Tejo Power Station (the old Electricity Museum, in Portuguese Museu da Electricidade)  is a cultural centre that presents the evolution of energy with a Museum of Science and Industrial Archaeology concept, where themed and experimental exhibits live side by side with a great variety of cultural events.
Located in the Belém area on terrain Lisbon usurped from the Tagus river (Tejo in Portuguese) at the end of the 19th century, in one of the city's areas with the greatest concentration of historical monuments where one can find, among others, the Jerónimos Monastery, the Belém Cultural Centre, the Tower of Belém, the Padrão dos Descobrimentos, the Portuguese Presidential Palace and Museum, the Coach Museum or the Cordoaria Nacional (national rope factory).
A building classified as a Public Interest Project, the Electricity Museum unfolds along the perimeter of the old thermoelectric plant – the Tejo Power Station, which illuminated the city of Lisbon for more than four decades.

It opened as a museum in 1990. Ten years later, the Electricity Museum's buildings and equipment underwent a period of rehabilitation, to reopen in 2006 fully renovated and with a new discourse and museum proposals.

Tejo Power Station (The old Electricity Museum) is a part of the heritage and structure of the EDP Foundation, which belongs to the EDP Group – Energias de Portugal, SA. In 2015 EDP announced that from 2016 the museum will form part of Museum of Art, Architecture and Technology.

Architecture 

The entire complex that makes up the Tejo Power Station constitutes an old thermoelectric plant that supplied power to Lisbon and its surrounding area. The building is unique amidst Lisbon's architectural setting, and is one of the most beautiful examples of Portuguese industrial architecture from the first half of the 20th century.

Tejo Power Station was built between 1908 and 1951, thereby undergoing several stages of expansion throughout this period. Its structure follows the western type of architecture of iron covered with brick, which shapes and decorates the facades in artistic styles that range from arte-nouveau, in its older sections (low-pressure building), to classicism in the more contemporary parts (high-pressure building). With the station's expansion, additional adjoining terrain and buildings were acquired over the years, becoming the great industrial complex it is today, with various cultural functions, always with the Tagus River, its namesake, in the backdrop.

Due to its state of conservation, the Museum underwent restoration work between 2001 and 2005 to consolidate its structure, renew its facades and interior machinery and, with a new museum project, transform it into what it is today.

In October 2015 EDP announced that London-based architectural practice AL A formed by Amanda Levete is designing a Kunsthalle sitting alongside the existing museum, to host a wide-ranging programme of exhibitions under the leadership of Pedro Gadahno. The new building was set to open in 2016 as MAAT - Museu de Arte, Arquitetura e Tecnologia.

Virtual Visit 
It all begins at the Praça do Carvão (Coal Square), the reception space, also a venue for exhibits and events; it was here in this location that, arriving from the Tagus River, tons of coal was unloaded to supply the boilers. In this same square, visitors can observe the sieve, the silos and the bucket elevators that mixed and carried the coal to the building's upper section and the High-Pressure boilers.

Entry into the industrial complex is made through the Sala de Exposições (Exhibition Room), the building that used to house the Low-Pressure boilers; currently, it is a free space where temporary exhibits take place and where one can still see the steam expansion ducts and coal silos from the long gone boilers.

From here one accesses the Sala das Caldeiras (Boiler Room), the building containing the old High-Pressure boilers; the large and impressive four boilers jump into view, each 30-metres high and with its respective control panels, air and fuel circuits, ventilators etc.
Having been musealised, boiler number 15 stands out, thereby enabling visitors to enter it and discover its structure and internal components (conveyor belt, Bailey walls, naphtha burners, water heating tubes, etc.). Aside from the boilers, this large space also tells the story of the construction of the Tejo Power Station and gives a first approach to the difficult working conditions endured by its workers.

The Sala dos Cinzeiros (Ash Room) is located on the bottom floor, the area where ash from the burned and raw coal was collected. Particular emphasis is given to the hard working conditions in this space, due to the intense heat and breathing in of ash from the coal burning. But the museum content does not end here, and examples of forging, carpentry and transport, as well as the origins and types of coal, are also presented.

Continuing on the visit, one reaches the Sala do Experimentar (Experimentation Room), which is divided into three sections: one dedicated to energy sources (both renewable and fossils), another to the scientists who over history contributed to breakthroughs in electric power production, and a third “learning by playing” area where there are several types of educational modules and games dealing with power. This is a space for fun and learning, showed at the end of a guided tour so that all may use their energy and acquired knowledge.

After experimentation, the Sala da Água (Water Room) is next. In this and the following space, the Sala das Máquinas (Machinery Room), the museum's discourse is once again the same as in the boiler room, with multicoloured tubes running between the machines and along the walls and ceiling. Each colour corresponds to a type of fluid that circulated in the tube: dry steam, wet steam, water etc.
Back to the Water Room, visitors can observe the water treatment process that enables the water to later be used in the boilers. The machines that are seen here are electropumps, blowers, filters or distillers from the 1940s.

Immediately following this room lies the Sala dos Condensadores (Condenser Room), the space that displays the condensers for steam refrigeration, as well as the pumps that drained water from the Tagus River, the cold source essential to the Thermoelectric Plant’s operation. In the room's upper section where the circuit breakers from the station's generator groups are displayed, there is a permanent exhibit called Faces of the Tejo Power Station, an homage to the Power Station's workers through photographs and audiovisuals that show their activity and working conditions.

On the floor above the condensers, the Sala dos Geradores (Generator Room) is found, where two of the Station's five sets of turbo alternators are exhibited. One of them was musealised, opening its structure to show the internal components and allow visitors a better perception of how electric power was generated.

Finally, on an upper level, there is the Sala de Comando (Control Room); the place where the generators were controlled from, as was the substation and the respective power distribution through the electric network powered by the station. Today, this space is converted into yet another experimentation area where the museum guides explain the history of electric power production through practical, everyday examples, such as battery lemons, or how renewable energy works, or by simplifying the production process of the station itself with a gas tank and a pressure cooker, all of this from an educational perspective adjusted to the audience in question.

Collection 
Tejo Power Station (Electricity Museum's) wealth is not limited only to the museum's visible aspects, but also includes its collection.
The priority has been to recover elements that are worth exhibiting, through their restoration and conservation, as well as the acquisition, preservation and inventory of new pieces from other facilities from all over the country, or from private donors.

At the moment, the Museum houses a large quantity of movable effects on exhibit, such as boilers, turbo alternators and condensers from the 1930-1950's, as well as collector's items, such as pieces and equipment dating from the end of the 19th century until modern times. To highlight, the collection of household appliances, electric machines, pieces and molds of public and private lighting in wood and iron, laboratory equipment, valves, models etc.

Documentation Centre 
The purpose of Tejo Power Station Documentation Centre is to establish itself in a centre that specialises in the study and knowledge of energy, electricity in particular. It contains approximately 60 000 volumes of documentation in several formats (documents, blueprints, books, videos, etc.) which cover the period dating from 1848 to the present day. More than 90 000 photographs and approximately 15 000 books, most of them specialising in electricity (in all its aspects: technical, constructive, economic, historic or social), as well as monographs on industrial heritage and archaeology, museology, themes surrounding general culture, encyclopedias and periodic publications.

The centre also has a policy regarding the identification and incorporation of documentation, which can be consulted on the internet or at the centre itself, as well as the publication of monographs on the history of electricity in Portugal.

Activities 

Throughout the year, many activities are carried out at the Electricity Museum, both inside and outside, such as temporary exhibits, concerts, conferences, etc.
Thus, the Coal Square serves not only to welcome visitors to the Museum, but sometimes transforms into an open-sky venue where a variety of captivating events are held.

See also

 
 Tejo Power Station (history)

References

 Barbosa, Pires; Cruz, Luís; Faria, Fernando, A Central Tejo: A fábrica que electrificou Lisboa, Museu da Electricidade and ed. Bizânzio, Lisboa, 2007
 Santos, António, A "Arquitectura da Electricidade" em Portugal (1906–1911), in Revista Arqueologia & Indústria, (2–3), pp. 123–148, Associação Portuguesa de Arqueologia Industrial (APAI), 1999/2000

External links
  EDP: Museu da Electricidade
  Wikienergia. Category Museu da Electricidade
  Database Documentation Center
  Official Website of the Month of Science
  Patrimonial card/IGESPAR
  “Museu da Electricidade. Um Museu com história, um Museu para o futuro.” Article Magazine INGENIUM
  Monsacro.net: Museu da Electricidade

Museums in Lisbon
Belém (Lisbon)
Industry museums
Science museums in Portugal
Tejo Power Station
Electric power in Portugal
Neoclassical architecture in Portugal
Museums established in 1990
1990 establishments in Portugal